Ince is a village and civil parish in the unitary authority of Cheshire West and Chester and the ceremonial county of Cheshire, England. It is situated immediately to the east of the Stanlow Oil Refinery. It shares Ince & Elton railway station with the village of Elton, which it runs into. 

According to the 2001 census it was recorded as having a population of 209.  By the 2011 census this had marginally reduced to 203.

Ince Park is being developed near the village.

History
The name Ince, first recorded in the Domesday Book as Inise,  is from the Primitive Welsh ïnïs, meaning "island". The name refers to the village's position on a low ridge in the marshlands around the rivers Gowy and Mersey.

Ince was a township split between the ancient parishes of both Ince and Stoak, within the Eddisbury Hundred. It existed as a civil parish between 1866 and 1950, when it was absorbed into Ellesmere Port civil parish. The population stood at 443 in 1801, 422 in 1851 and 290 in 1901.
The present civil parish was separated from Ellesmere Port in 1987, with smaller boundaries.

Landmarks
The remains of Ince Manor, one of the earliest recorded properties of St Werburgh's Abbey (now Chester Cathedral), were given Grade I listed status in 1963.

Governance
Since 1983, Ince has formed part of the Ellesmere Port and Neston parliamentary constituency, presently represented by Justin Madders of the Labour Party.

The unitary authority of Cheshire West and Chester replaced Chester City Council and Cheshire County Council on 1 April 2009. Ince is within the electoral ward of Gowy Rural.

Ince is represented by its own parish council.

Transport

Ince & Elton railway station serves both Ince and Elton villages, but it is just within the Elton boundary. There are infrequent Monday to Saturday services to Ellesmere Port, Stanlow & Thornton, Helsby, Liverpool Lime Street, and Warrington Bank Quay. The nearest station with better services and facilities is either Ellesmere Port or Helsby.

The X2 bus visits Ince hourly in each direction and operates from Chester bus station with a destination of Runcorn. The service is operated by Stagecoach Merseyside & South Lancashire. Ince also has a few morning and evening journeys on service DB8 to Chester Business Park.

Public transport in Ince is supported by the North Cheshire Rail User Group.  It campaigns for better rail services and improved public transport interchange.

Economy and industry
Landowners The Peel Group are developing a  industrial site on a former water meadow at Ince Park. The Protos "energy and resource hub" houses a biomass power station, a timber recycling plant and designated "nature areas".  
The construction of a facility to recover energy from non-recyclable waste began in 2020.

See also

 Listed buildings in Ince
 St James' Church, Ince
 Ince Power Station

References

External links

Villages in Cheshire
Civil parishes in Cheshire